William "Dick" Price Football Stadium is a 30,000-seat, multi-purpose stadium located on the campus of Norfolk State University in Norfolk, Virginia, United States. It opened in 1997. The home of the Norfolk State Spartans football team, it was named in honor of former athletics director and head football and track coach Dick Price. The stadium features mostly bleacher seats with some chairbacks and has two videoboards, one behind each end zone.

See also
 List of NCAA Division I FCS football stadiums

References

External links
 Official website
 NSU bio of Dick Price

College football venues
Sports venues in Norfolk, Virginia
Norfolk State Spartans football
Multi-purpose stadiums in the United States
1997 establishments in Virginia
American football venues in Virginia
Sports venues completed in 1997